Ollie Grieve (30 October 1920 – 2 February 1978) was an Australian rules footballer in the Victorian Football League (VFL).

References
 Ollie Grieve at Blueseum

External links

1920 births
1978 deaths
Carlton Football Club players
Carlton Football Club Premiership players
John Nicholls Medal winners
Australian rules footballers from Victoria (Australia)
One-time VFL/AFL Premiership players